Bernard Zabłocki (January 1, 1907 in Navahrudak – March 3, 2002 in Delta, British Columbia) was a Polish microbiologist and immunologist. He was a professor at the University of Łódź (since 1950) and a member of the Polish Academy of Sciences (since 1965).

References
 

1907 births
2002 deaths
People from Navahrudak
People from Novogrudsky Uyezd
Polish immunologists
Polish microbiologists